Le Jeune Werther is a 1993 French drama film directed and written by Jacques Doillon. It was entered into the 43rd Berlin International Film Festival, where it won the Blue Angel Award.

Cast
 Ismaël Jolé-Ménébhi as Ismael
 Faye Anastasia as Faye
 Jessica Tharaud as Jessica
 Mirabelle Rousseau as Mirabelle
 Miren Capello as Miren
 Pierre Mezerette as Pierre
 Simon Clavière as Simon
 Sunny Lebrati as Sunny
 Thomas Brémond as Theo
 Pierre Encrèvé as Headmaster
 Margot Abascal as Guillaume's Sister
 Hervé Duhamel as French Teacher
 Marie de Laubier as Maths Teacher
 Ève Guillou as History Teacher

References

External links

1993 films
French drama films
1990s French-language films
1993 drama films
Films about suicide
Films directed by Jacques Doillon
Films scored by Philippe Sarde
1990s French films